Drums of Africa is a 1963 American adventure film set in Africa, directed by James B. Clark.

It used footage from the 1950 film of King Solomon's Mines.

Plot
Three adventurers fight slave traders in the Congo.

Cast
Frankie Avalon as Brian Ferrers
Mariette Hartley as Ruth Knight
Lloyd Bochner as David Moore
Torin Thatcher as Jack Cuortemayn
Hari Rhodes as Kasongo
George Sawaya as Arab
Michael Pate as Viledo
Ron Whelan as Ship captain
Peter Mamakos as Chavera

Production
The film was shot on the MGM backlot using footage from King Solomon's Mines (1950).

The film was originally known as African Adventure. Mariette Hartley was under contract to MGM after Ride the High Country.

References

External links

1963 films
Metro-Goldwyn-Mayer films
Films directed by James B. Clark
Films scored by Johnny Mandel
Films set in Africa
Films set in the 1890s
1960s historical adventure films
American historical adventure films
1960s English-language films
1960s American films